In probability theory, a Chernoff bound is an exponentially decreasing upper bound on the tail of a random variable based on its moment generating function or exponential moments. The minimum of all such exponential bounds forms the Chernoff or Chernoff-Cramér bound, which may decay faster than exponential (e.g. sub-Gaussian). The Chernoff bound is especially useful for sums of independent random variables, such as sums of Bernoulli random variables.

Despite being named after Herman Chernoff, the author of the paper it first appeared in, Chernoff attributes the result to Herman Rubin.  It is a sharper bound than the first- or second-moment-based tail bounds such as Markov's inequality or Chebyshev's inequality, which only yield power-law bounds on tail decay. However, when applied to sums the Chernoff bound requires the variates to be independent, a condition that is not required by either Markov's inequality or Chebyshev's inequality (although Chebyshev's inequality does require the variates to be pairwise independent).

The Chernoff bound is related to the Bernstein inequalities. It is also used to prove Hoeffding's inequality, Bennett's inequality, and McDiarmid's inequality.

Generic Chernoff bounds 

Since this bound holds for every positive , we may take the infimum:

Performing the same analysis with negative  we get a similar bound on the left tail:

and

The quantity  can be expressed as the expectation value , or equivalently .

Properties 

The exponential function is convex, so by Jensen's inequality .

The logarithm of the two-sided Chernoff bound is known as the rate function (or Cramér transform)  . It is equivalent to the Legendre–Fenchel transform or convex conjugate of the cumulant generating function , defined as: The moment generating function is increasing and log-convex, so by the properties of the convex conjugate, the Chernoff bound must be decreasing and log-concave. It attains its maximum at the mean, and is invariant under translation: .

The Chernoff bound is exact if only if  is a single concentrated mass (degenerate distribution). The bound is tight only at or beyond the extremes of a bounded random variable, where the infima are attained for infinite . For unbounded random variables the bound is nowhere tight, though it is asymptotically tight up to sub-exponential factors ("exponentially tight"). Individual moments can provide tighter bounds, at the cost of greater analytical complexity.

In practice, the exact Chernoff bound may be unwieldy or difficult to evaluate analytically, in which case a suitable upper bound on the moment (or cumulant) generating function may be used instead (e.g. a sub-parabolic CGF giving a sub-Gaussian Chernoff bound).

Sums of independent random variables 

and:

 

Specific Chernoff bounds are attained by calculating the moment-generating function  for specific instances of the random variables . 

When the random variables are also identically distributed (iid), the Chernoff bound for the sum reduces to a simple rescaling of the single-variable Chernoff bound. That is, the Chernoff bound for the average of n iid variables is equivalent to the nth power of the Chernoff bound on a single variable (see Cramér's theorem).

Sums of independent bounded random variables 

Chernoff bounds may also be applied to general sums of independent, bounded random variables, regardless of their distribution; this is known as Hoeffding's inequality. The proof follows a similar approach to the other Chernoff bounds, but applying Hoeffding's lemma to bound the moment generating functions (see Hoeffding's inequality).  
Hoeffding's inequality. Suppose  are independent random variables taking values in  Let  denote their sum and let  denote the sum's expected value. Then for any ,

Sums of independent Bernoulli random variables 
The bounds in the following sections for Bernoulli random variables are derived by using that, for a Bernoulli random variable  with probability p of being equal to 1,

One can encounter many flavors of Chernoff bounds: the original additive form (which gives a bound on the absolute error) or the more practical multiplicative form (which bounds the error relative to the mean).

Multiplicative form (relative error) 
Multiplicative Chernoff bound. Suppose  are independent random variables taking values in  Let  denote their sum and let  denote the sum's expected value. Then for any ,

A similar proof strategy can be used to show that

The above formula is often unwieldy in practice, so the following looser but more convenient bounds are often used, which follow from the inequality  from the list of logarithmic inequalities:

Additive form (absolute error) 
The following theorem is due to Wassily Hoeffding and hence is called the Chernoff–Hoeffding theorem.

Chernoff–Hoeffding theorem.

where

is the Kullback–Leibler divergence between Bernoulli distributed random variables with parameters x and y respectively. If  then  which means

This result is a special case of Hoeffding's inequality. Sometimes, the bounds

Applications
Chernoff bounds have very useful applications in set balancing and packet routing in sparse networks.

The set balancing problem arises while designing statistical experiments. Typically while designing a statistical experiment, given the features of each participant in the experiment, we need to know how to divide the participants into 2 disjoint groups such that each feature is roughly as balanced as possible between the two groups.

Chernoff bounds are also used to obtain tight bounds for permutation routing problems which reduce network congestion while routing packets in sparse networks.

Chernoff bounds are used in computational learning theory to prove that a learning algorithm is probably approximately correct, i.e. with high probability the algorithm has small error on a sufficiently large training data set.

Chernoff bounds can be effectively used to evaluate the "robustness level" of an application/algorithm by exploring its perturbation space with randomization.
The use of the Chernoff bound permits one to abandon the strong—and mostly unrealistic—small perturbation hypothesis (the perturbation magnitude is small). The robustness level can be, in turn, used either to validate or reject a specific algorithmic choice, a hardware implementation or the appropriateness of a solution whose structural parameters are affected by uncertainties.

A simple and common use of Chernoff bounds is for "boosting" of randomized algorithms. If one has an algorithm that outputs a guess that is the desired answer with probability p > 1/2, then one can get a higher success rate by running the algorithm  times and outputting a guess that is output by more than n/2 runs of the algorithm. (There cannot be more than one such guess by the pigeonhole principle.) Assuming that these algorithm runs are independent, the probability that more than n/2 of the guesses is correct is equal to the probability that the sum of independent Bernoulli random variables  that are 1 with probability p is more than n/2. This can be shown to be at least  via the multiplicative Chernoff bound (Corollary 13.3 in Sinclair's class notes).:

Matrix Chernoff bound 

Rudolf Ahlswede and Andreas Winter introduced a Chernoff bound for matrix-valued random variables. The following version of the inequality can be found in the work of Tropp.

Let us denote by  the operator norm of the matrix . If  holds almost surely for all , then for every 

The operator norm of the sum of t independent samples is precisely the maximum deviation among d independent random walks of length t. In order to achieve a fixed bound on the maximum deviation with constant probability, it is easy to see that t should grow logarithmically with d in this scenario.

The following theorem can be obtained by assuming M has low rank, in order to avoid the dependency on the dimensions.

Theorem without the dependency on the dimensions
Assume that each element on the support of M has at most rank r. Set 

If  holds almost surely, then

where  are i.i.d. copies of M.

Sampling variant

The following variant of Chernoff's bound can be used to bound the probability that a majority in a population will become a minority in a sample, or vice versa.

Suppose there is a general population A and a sub-population B ⊆ A. Mark the relative size of the sub-population (|B|/|A|) by r.

Suppose we pick an integer k and a random sample S ⊂ A of size k. Mark the relative size of the sub-population in the sample (|B∩S|/|S|) by rS.

Then, for every fraction d ∈ [0,1]:

In particular, if B is a majority in A (i.e. r > 0.5) we can bound the probability that B will remain majority in S(rS > 0.5) by taking: d = 1 − 1/(2r):

This bound is of course not tight at all. For example, when r = 0.5 we get a trivial bound Prob > 0.

Proofs

Multiplicative form
For a Bernoulli variable:

This proves the result desired.

Chernoff–Hoeffding theorem (additive form)
Let .

Now, knowing that , we have

Therefore, we can easily compute the infimum, using calculus:

Setting the equation to zero and solving, we have

so that

Thus,

We now have our desired result, that

To complete the proof for the symmetric case, we simply define the random variable , apply the same proof, and plug it into our bound.

See also

 Bernstein inequalities
Concentration inequality − a summary of tail-bounds on random variables.
Cramér's theorem
Entropic value at risk
 Hoeffding's inequality
Matrix Chernoff bound
Moment generating function

References

Further reading
 
 
 
 

Probabilistic inequalities